Comibaena delicatior is a moth of the  family Geometridae. It is found in Taiwan, the Russian Far East, Korea and Japan. They are attracted to lamps.

The wingspan is 23–27 mm.

References

Moths described in 1897
Geometrinae
Moths of Japan